Akuku-Toru is a Local Government Area in Rivers State, Nigeria. Its headquarters are in the town of Abonnema.

It has an area of 1,443 km and a population of 156,006 at the 2006 census.

Wards 

 Alise Group
 Briggs I
 Briggs II
 Briggs III
 Georgewill I
 Georgewill II
 Georgewill III
 Jack I
 Jack II
 Jack III
 Kula I
 Kula II
 Manuel I
 Manuel II
 Manuel III
 North/South Group
 Obonoma

References

Local Government Areas in Rivers State
Populated coastal places in Rivers State
1990 establishments in Nigeria
1990s establishments in Rivers State